Six regiments of the British Army have been numbered the 96th Regiment of Foot:

96th Regiment of Foot (1760), raised in 1760, disbanded 1763
96th Regiment of Foot (British Musketeers), raised in 1780
96th Regiment of Foot (1793). raised in 1793. numbered 96th in 1794, disbanded 1796.
96th Regiment of Foot, formed in 1803 from the 2nd Battalion, 52nd Regiment
96th (Queen's Own Germans) Regiment of Foot, renumbered from the 97th in 1816
96th Regiment of Foot, raised in 1824